One Oxford Centre is one of the major distinctive and recognizable features of Downtown Pittsburgh Pennsylvania, United States.   The complex is named for Oxford Development, the developer and previous owner.

Among the commercial tenants of One Oxford Centre are Buchanan Ingersoll & Rooney PC, HFF Inc., the Federal Reserve Bank of Cleveland Pittsburgh Branch, and Morgan, Lewis & Bockius.

History

The proposed tower was announced and submitted for county approval in October 1978 as the "Grant Land project". In April 1983, DeBartolo Company, which constructed the tower, announced plans for "Two Oxford Centre" to the immediate northeast of the main tower and across the street from Pittsburgh City Hall and the Frick Building.  Two Oxford Centre was to be noticeably taller than One Oxford, however the plans and development were dependent on securing a majority tenant which never materialized.

Design

Completed in 1983, One Oxford Centre has 46 floors in its main tower and rises 615 feet (187 m) above Downtown Pittsburgh. Although its address is simply One Oxford Centre,  the building is located on the 300 block of Grant Street. Since the towers opening it has been home to a full-service health/business club, The Rivers Club. The complex also contains a multi-level parking garage and some street level retail and office space one block west of Grant Street.

At night, forty-three 1,500-watt spotlights illuminate the centre with a total of 54,500 watts that create a glowing effect that is said to be greater than any other highrise in the United States.  One Oxford Centre was developed by Oxford Development Company and designed by architecture firm Hellmuth, Obata, & Kassabaum.

In popular culture

A composite image of the main tower of PPG Place and Oxford Centre is used as the Fiddler's Green luxury high-rise in the movie Land of the Dead. Another interesting fact is that a street (Cherry Way) passes through the tower on its lower levels.

The building is featured in Episode 1656 of the television program Mister Rogers' Neighborhood on "Up and Down." Mr. Rogers and the "Speed Delivery"-man Mr. McFeely ride the building's escalators and elevators up and down.

The tower is used for exterior shots of the Newman tower on the CBS daytime soap opera, The Young and the Restless.

Building Ownership

Since developing the Property in 1983, Oxford Development had been the sole owner and operator. 
In January 2016 San Francisco-based Shorenstein Properties acquired One Oxford Centre under its Shorenstein Realty Investors Eleven LP, a $1.2 billion fund. CBRE Group was appointed as the leasing agent to fill up the remaining vacant space in the building. Shorenstein implemented an intensive capital improvement program that included repairing deferred maintenance throughout the property as well as aesthetic upgrades to the lobby and common areas.

See also
List of tallest buildings in Pittsburgh

References

External links

One Oxford Centre homepage
Oxford Development
One Oxford Centre at Skyscrapers.com
 

Skyscraper office buildings in Pittsburgh
Office buildings completed in 1983
HOK (firm) buildings